Events in the year 1588 in Norway.

Incumbents
Monarch: Frederick II (until 4 April); then Christian IV

Events
4 April - Christian IV of Denmark-Norway becomes king after the death of his father, Frederick II
August - Axel Gyldenstierne was appointed Governor-General of Norway.
21 September – Santiago, a Spanish Armada supply ship, got wrecked near Mosterhamn in Hardanger Fjord.

Arts and literature

Births

Deaths
4 April - Frederick II, king of Denmark and Norway (born 1534)

Full date unknown
Axel Gyntersberg, nobleman and overlord (born c. 1525).

See also

References